Prepodesma is a monotypic genus of flowering plants belonging to the family Aizoaceae. The only species is Prepodesma orpenii.

Its native range is South African Republic.

References

Aizoaceae
Aizoaceae genera
Monotypic Caryophyllales genera
Taxa named by N. E. Brown